Dame Sarah Elizabeth Worthington,  (née Monks; born 18 February 1955) is a British legal scholar, barrister, and Deputy High Court Judge in the Chancery Division, specialising in company law, commercial law, and equity. From 2011 to 2022, she was the Downing Professor of the Laws of England at the University of Cambridge. She is Treasurer of the British Academy and a trustee of the British Museum.

Early life and education
The then Sarah Monks was born on 18 February 1955 in Barnsley, Yorkshire, England. Her parents moved soon after her birth to Uganda, and then to Kenya, where she lived until she was 8 years old. They then moved to Australia. She studied natural science and mathematics at the Australian National University, graduating with a Bachelor of Science (BSc) degree in 1974. From 1975 to 1976, she was a doctoral candidate at the University of Queensland, undertaking cancer research; she left without completing. In 1977, while training to be a teacher, she completed a Graduate Diploma in Education at the University of Queensland.

Worthington changed directions, going from science to law. Having studied part-time, she graduated from the University of Queensland with a first class Bachelor of Laws (LLB) degree in 1986. She completed a Master of Laws (LLM) degree at the University of Melbourne in 1990. She undertook postgraduate research in law at Wolfson College, Cambridge, and completed her Doctor of Philosophy (PhD) degree in 1995. Her doctoral thesis was titled "Proprietary interests in commercial transactions".

Career

Scientific career
Worthington's early career was in science. From 1974 to 1977, she was a departmental tutor in the Biochemistry Department of the University of Queensland. From 1978 to 1979, she was a senior science teacher at San Sisto College, an all-girls Catholic school in Brisbane, Queensland.

Academic career
Worthington's legal career started in 1988 as a lecturer in law in the Faculty of Law of the University of Melbourne. She then spent time in Moscow, Russia, before moving back to England in 1994. Having joined the Department of Law of Birkbeck College, London, she was a lecturer from 1994 to 1996, and a senior lecturer from 1996 to 1997.

Worthington then moved to the London School of Economics (LSE) where she was a senior lecturer from 1997 to 2001, a Reader in Law from 2001 to 2003, and Professor of Law from 2003 to 2011. She was additionally a Pro-Director of LSE (with responsibility for research and external relations) between 2005 and 2010.

In 2011, Worthington moved to the University of Cambridge where she had been appointed the Downing Professor of the Laws of England and elected a Fellow of Trinity College, Cambridge. Upon arrival at Cambridge, she set up the Cambridge Private Law Centre and now serves as its director. She retired from the Downing Professorship in 2022.

Worthington has held a number of visiting appointments. She has been a Professorial Fellow of the University of Melbourne since 2005. From 2009 to 2010, she held the Francqui Chair at the University of Leuven. From 2010 to 2015, she was Cheng Yu Tong Distinguished Visiting Professor at the University of Hong Kong. Since 2012, she has been a Distinguished Fellow of the Australian Centre for Private Law of TC Beirne School of Law, University of Queensland.

Legal career
On 10 March 2005, Worthington was Called to the Bar at Middle Temple, thereby becoming a barrister. She was President of The Society of Legal Scholars from 2008 to 2009. On 12 October 2010, she was made a Bencher of Middle Temple. She is an academic member of 3/4 South Square, a set of commercial barristers. She was made an honorary Queen's Counsel in 2010.

Personal life
In 1978, the then Sarah Monks married Peter Worthington. Together they have four children: two sons and two daughters.

Honours
In 2009, Worthington was elected a Fellow of the British Academy (FBA), the United Kingdom's national academy for the humanities and social sciences. She is an overseas Fellow of the Australian Academy of the Law (FAAL). In February 2010, she was appointed Queen's Counsel (Honoris Causa) and thereby granted the post-nominal letters "QC (Hon)". She became a member of Academia Europaea in 2012.

She was appointed Dame Commander of the Order of the British Empire (DBE) in the 2020 Birthday Honours for services to English private law.

Selected works

References

1955 births
Living people
People from Barnsley
British legal scholars
Dames Commander of the Order of the British Empire
Downing Professors of the Laws of England
Fellows of the British Academy
Fellows of Trinity College, Cambridge
Members of Academia Europaea
British barristers
Members of the Middle Temple
Academic staff of the University of Melbourne
Academics of Birkbeck, University of London
Academics of the London School of Economics
Honorary King's Counsel
Australian National University alumni
University of Queensland alumni
University of Melbourne alumni